Padmavati Rao, credited as Akshatha Rao in Kannada films, is an Indian actress, theatre personality, poet, dancer and translator. She is known for her theatre activities and performances in movies including Ondanondu Kaladalli (1978),Geetha (1981 film),Pardes (1997), Padmaavat (2018) and Tanhaji (2020).

Personal life
Padmavati was born in Delhi. She is the sister of actress Arundhati Nag.

Career

Film career
Rao's debut movie was 1978 Kannada film Ondanondu Kaladalli, directed by Girish Karnad. In 1981, she played the title role of Geetha in the film Geetha, directed by Shankar Nag. She went on to appear in movies including Pardes and Padmaavat. She played Amitabh Bacchan's wife in the critically acclaimed film Te3n, directed by Ribhu Dasgupta. She performed as Jijabai, mother of Shivaji, in the 2020 film Tanhaji.

Theatre career
Rao's career was started with theatre activities. She has conducted and performed plays and workshops across India. She first acted in theatre under the direction of Shankar Nag. She assisted him in Malgudi Days as assistant director, also acted and dubbed for the same project. In her theatre career, Rao has worked with Girish Karnad, M. S. Sathyu, Ramesh Talwar, Shaukat Azmi, A. K. Hanagal and many other theatre personalities. Her theatre work Kitchen Poems, a solo performance, was much appreciated. She has been doing theatre activities for children.

Filmography

References

External links
 

Actresses in Marathi theatre
Actresses in Kannada television
Actresses in Kannada cinema
Actresses in Kannada theatre
Actresses in Hindi cinema
Actresses in Malayalam cinema
21st-century Indian actresses
Actresses in Marathi cinema
1963 births
Living people